The Western Professional Hockey League (abbreviated WPHL) is a defunct minor professional ice hockey league.

The WPHL operated from 1996 to 2001 with teams based in the southern United States, primarily Texas and Louisiana. The league started with six teams in the 1996–97 season and grew to 18 teams in 1999–00. After the 2000–01 season, the WPHL merged with the Central Hockey League. Former WPHL teams continued to play in the CHL until the 2012–13 season.

Teams in alphabetical order

Abilene Aviators (Abilene, Texas) 1998–2000; folded during the 1999–2000 season
Alexandria Warthogs (Alexandria, Louisiana) 1998–2000
Amarillo Rattlers (Amarillo, Texas) 1996–2001; continued in CHL until 2010 as Amarillo Gorillas
Arkansas GlacierCats (Little Rock, Arkansas) 1998–2000 
Austin Ice Bats (Austin, Texas) 1996–2001; continued in CHL until 2008
Bossier-Shreveport Mudbugs (Bossier City, Louisiana) 2000–01; continued in CHL until 2011
Central Texas Stampede (Belton, Texas) 1996–2001; folded during the 2000–01 season
Corpus Christi IceRays (Corpus Christi, Texas) 1998–2001; continued in CHL until 2010 when the owners added a junior team in the North American Hockey League
El Paso Buzzards (El Paso, Texas) 1996–2001; continued in CHL until 2003
Fort Worth Brahmas (Fort Worth, Texas) 1997–2001; continued in CHL until 2013 when the owners added a junior team in the North American Hockey League
Lake Charles Ice Pirates (Lake Charles, Louisiana) 1997–2001; folded during the 2001 CHL merger
Lubbock Cotton Kings (Lubbock, Texas) 1999–2001; continued in CHL until 2007
Monroe Moccasins (Monroe, Louisiana) 1997–2001; folded during the 2001 CHL merger
New Mexico Scorpions (Rio Rancho, New Mexico) 1996–2001; continued in CHL until 2009
Odessa Jackalopes (Odessa, Texas) 1997–2001; continued in CHL until 2011 when the owners added a junior team in the North American Hockey League
San Angelo Outlaws (San Angelo, Texas) 1996–2001; continued in CHL until 2005 as San Angelo Saints
Shreveport Mudbugs (Shreveport, Louisiana) 1997–2000
Tupelo T-Rex (Tupelo, Mississippi) 1998–2001; chose not to join the CHL during the 2001 merger and launched a junior team instead in the America West Hockey League
Waco Wizards (Waco, Texas) 1996–2000; folded during the 1999–2000 season

Champions

President's Cup winners
Playoff champions:
1997 – El Paso Buzzards
1998 – El Paso Buzzards
1999 – Shreveport Mudbugs
2000 – Shreveport Mudbugs
2001 – Bossier-Shreveport Mudbugs

Governor's Cup
Regular season champions:
1996–97 – New Mexico Scorpions
1997–98 – Fort Worth Brahmas
1998–99 – Shreveport Mudbugs
1999–00 – Central Texas Stampede
2000–01 – Tupelo T-Rex

Individual league awards

1996–97
Coach of the year - Todd Brost, El Paso
Most valuable player - Chris Brooks, Amarillo
Scoring champion - Chris Brooks, Amarillo
Most outstanding goaltender - Daniel Berthiaume, Central Texas
Most outstanding defenseman - Jody Praznik, New Mexico
Playoff most valuable player - Chris MacKenzie, El Paso
All-star game most valuable player - Doug Smith, Central Texas

1997–98
Coach of the year - Bill McDonald, Fort Worth Brahmas
Most valuable player - Jamie Thompson, El Paso
Man of the year - Jamie Thompson, El Paso
Scoring champion - Carl Boudreau, San Angelo
Rookie of the year - Sami Laine, Odessa
Most outstanding goaltender - Kevin St. Pierre, Shreveport
Most outstanding defenseman - Eric Ricard, New Mexico
Playoff most valuable player - Billy Trew, El Paso
All-star game most valuable player - Sylvain Naud, New Mexico

1998–99
Coach of the year - Todd Lalonde, Waco
Most valuable player - Chris Robertson, Corpus Christi
Man of the year - Graeme Townshend, Lake Charles
Scoring champion - Carl Boudreau, San Angelo
Rookie of the year - Kory Cooper, Waco
Most outstanding goaltender - Kory Cooper, Waco
Most outstanding defenseman - Eric Brule, Abilene
Playoff most valuable player - John Vecchiarelli, Shreveport
All-star game most valuable player - Billy Trew, El Paso

1999–00
Coach of the year - Brian Curran, Monroe
Most valuable player - Ron Newhook, Central Texas
Man of the year - Brad Haelzle, Amarillo and Scott Muscutt, Shreveport
Scoring champion - Geoff Bumstead, Corpus Christi
Rookie of the year - Dan Price, Austin
Most outstanding goaltender - Matt Barnes, Central Texas
Most outstanding defenseman - Arturs Kupaks, Lubbock
Playoff most valuable player - Hugo Hamelin, Shreveport
All-star game most valuable player - Dorian Anneck, Monroe

2000–01
Coach of the year -Don McKee, Odessa
Most valuable player - Jason Firth, Tupelo
Man of the year - Travis Van Tighem, New Mexico
Scoring champion - Jason Firth, Tupelo
Rookie of the year - Ken Carroll, Bossier-Shreveport
Most outstanding goaltender - Ken Carroll, Bossier-Shreveport
Most outstanding defenseman - Mark DeSantis, New Mexico
Playoff most valuable player - Jason Campbell, Bossier-Shreveport
All-star game most valuable player - Kyle Reeves, Lubbock
Rick Kozuback Award - Trent Eigner, El Paso

See also
List of developmental and minor sports leagues
List of ice hockey leagues
Minor league
Sports league attendances

References

 
Defunct ice hockey leagues in the United States